Santa Anna is a town in Coleman County in Central Texas, United States. Its population was 1,099 at the 2010 census.

Geography

Santa Anna is located in east central Coleman County. Three U.S. highways pass through the center of town. U.S. Route 283 leads south  to Brady, U.S. Route 67 leads west  to Ballinger, U.S. Route 84 and US 283 together lead northwest  to Coleman, the county seat, and US 67 and 84 together lead east  to Brownwood.

Climate

The climate in this area is characterized by hot, humid summers and generally mild to cool winters. According to the Köppen climate classification system, Santa Anna has a humid subtropical climate, Cfa on climate maps.

History

The twin mesas in central Coleman County have always been a landmark. One of the earliest maps of Texas shows a mountain near the center of the state with the notation, "Santa Anna's Peaks". The mountain and later the town were named for Comanche war chief Santanna, or Santa Anna.

Texas Rangers camped at the foot of the mountain long before the area was settled. Cattle drives from South Texas to the northern markets passed through the gap in the mountain along a military road. This road helped supply the outpost forts along the Texas Forts Trail. The first permanent European-American settlers soon built homes near a freshwater spring at the foot of the mountain. One enterprising settler stocked a supply of goods for trail drivers and settlers, starting the first business at "The Gap" in the early 1870s. In 1879, a petition to open a post office was filed, and the name of "Santa Anna" was chosen.

During the construction of the Santa Fe Railroad, a group of residents bought land along the right-of-way. Stone buildings were built from limestone quarried from the cap rock of the west mountain. Several businesses moved from Trickham and Brownwood to be a part of the new community. In 1886, The Santa Anna News was established. The first telephone in the county was a private line from Brownwood to Coleman, connected in the Melton Hotel in Santa Anna. A small local exchange was opened in 1892. A drugstore and a bank were opened in the 1880s, and a one-room school was opened that soon expanded to four rooms.

As the open range was preempted and sold, land was cultivated, with cotton the principal crop. Santa Anna eventually had four cotton gins in operation, and was also a major rail shipping point for livestock. The town became a trade center with a thriving business district that included drugstores, hotels, banks, livery stables, and produce houses. One of the early buildings, still a landmark downtown, housed an opera house, where traveling groups and local performers provided entertainment and culture.

After World War I, Dr. T.R. Sealy established a hospital that soon became widely known. A nursing school was founded in the 1920s to provide trained nurses, continuing until the death of Dr. Sealy in the mid-1930s.

During the first half of the 20th century, Santa Anna thrived as a small farming and ranching community. It later developed businesses related to the area oil industry.

Since the beginning of the 21st century, tourism has emerged as a new industry in Santa Anna. Currently, 38 businesses are located in Santa Anna, of which 13 are less than three years old. Custom hand-crafted furniture has become a hallmark of the city. Other popular draws include a steakhouse, Dairy Queen, numerous antique stores, furniture stores, and specialty shops. Santa Anna and the surrounding area are also popular among dove, quail, turkey, and deer hunters.

Demographics

2020 census

As of the 2020 United States census, there were 1,014 people, 405 households, and 268 families residing in the town.

2000 census
As of the census of 2000, 1,081 people, 446 households, and 283 families resided in the town. The population density was 558.0 people per square mile (215.1/km). The 574 housing units averaged 296.3 per square mile (114.2/km). The racial makeup of the town was 88.90% White, 3.89% African American, 0.65% Native American, 0.09% Pacific Islander, 4.72% from other races, and 1.76% from two or more races. Hispanics or Latinos of any race were 19.06% of the population.

Of the 446 households, 28.5% had children under the age of 18 living with them, 47.1% were married couples living together, 12.3% had a female householder with no husband present, and 36.5% were not families. About 34.5% of all households were made up of individuals, and 18.6% had someone living alone who was 65 years of age or older. The average household size was 2.36 and the average family size was 3.01.

In the town, the population was distributed as 26.3% under the age of 18, 7.8% from 18 to 24, 21.6% from 25 to 44, 23.4% from 45 to 64, and 20.9% who were 65 years of age or older. The median age was 41 years. For every 100 females, there were 91.3 males. For every 100 females age 18 and over, there were 86.2 males.

The median income for a household in the town was $22,857, and for a family was $31,250. Males had a median income of $29,886 versus $17,917 for females. The per capita income for the town was $11,065. About 20.4% of families and 23.2% of the population were below the poverty line, including 26.6% of those under age 18 and 24.4% of those age 65 or over.

Education
The town is served by the Santa Anna Independent School District.

Notable people 

 Louis Crump, Texas state senator
 Bobby Layne, Pro Football Hall of Fame quarterback

Gallery

References

External links

 Town of Santa Anna official website
 Santa Anna Economic Development Corporation
 Santa Anna Historical Development
 Coleman County Telephone Cooperative, Inc.

Towns in Coleman County, Texas
Towns in Texas